is located on the island of Kitadaitōjima in the village of Kitadaitō, Shimajiri District, Okinawa Prefecture, Japan.

The prefecture operates the airport, which is classified as a third class airport.

Only a round flight from Naha, to Kitadaitō and Minami Daito Airport, back to Naha is operated every day. The route differs on the day of the week.

History
Kitadaito Airport was opened in 1971 as an emergency 760 meter airstrip, constructed of crushed coral by the United States Civil Administration of the Ryukyu Islands. The runway was paved and extended to 800 meters in 1978, when scheduled passenger services commenced. The runway was extended to 1500 meters in 1997. At present, there is only one scheduled flight per day.

Airlines and destinations

References

External links

 Kitadaito Airport
 Kitadaito Airport Guide from Japan Airlines
 

Airports in Okinawa
Daitō Islands